In enzymology, a putrescine N-hydroxycinnamoyltransferase is an enzyme that catalyzes the chemical reaction

caffeoyl-CoA + putrescine  CoA + N-caffeoylputrescine

Thus, the two substrates of this enzyme are caffeoyl-CoA and putrescine, whereas its two products are CoA and N-caffeoylputrescine.

This enzyme belongs to the family of transferases, specifically those acyltransferases transferring groups other than aminoacyl groups.  The systematic name of this enzyme class is caffeoyl-CoA:putrescine N-(3,4-dihydroxycinnamoyl)transferase. Other names in common use include caffeoyl-CoA putrescine N-caffeoyl transferase, PHT, putrescine hydroxycinnamoyl transferase, hydroxycinnamoyl-CoA:putrescine hydroxycinnamoyltransferase, and putrescine hydroxycinnamoyltransferase.

References

 

EC 2.3.1
Enzymes of unknown structure